Filmmakers Lisa Lax and Nancy Stern capture Emmanuel Yeboah's heart, spirit, and determination through the 2005 documentary Emmanuel’s Gift, based on the true story of Emmanuel's life solely dedicated to making change. Narrated by Oprah Winfrey, the documentary follows Emmanuel on his journey to change the political and societal norms wrapped around disabled people in his home country of Ghana. Being that he was born with a deformed right leg, Emmanuel witnessed firsthand his whole life how disabled people were treated and viewed in the eyes of society. Children born with disabilities in Ghana are often abandoned or, in more extreme cases, killed. If they do survive, they often become poor beggars on the street. He, on the other hand, grew up in a small home with his mother and family. His father abandoned his mother when he found out that his son had a deformed leg. Emmanuel shined shoes every day for $2, refusing to let the prejudices against disabled people get to his head. One day he put in a grant request to the Challenged Athletes Foundation based in California all the way over in the United States. His request was not one for money, but rather for a bike that he would later receive to travel nearly 380 miles across the entire country of Ghana on to show those that did not support equal rights that disabled people can accomplish above and beyond what society tells them they can.
Word spread fast about Emmanuel's long journey on the bike given to him by the foundation. The Challenged Athletes Foundation, who gave Emmanuel the bicycle, reached out and asked him to come to America to do their triathlon. Being the ultimate go getter, Emmanuel went along and was even given a prosthetic leg after due time. Being as selfless as he is, Emmanuel used his newly found fame to better the 2 million disabled people of Ghana. He was awarded the CAF Most Inspirational Athlete of the Year Award and Nike's Casey Martin award in America. Along with these awards he was also gifted money, and he used it all to give the people of Ghana free wheelchairs, and started the Emmanuel Education Fund. Hearing about his son's fame, Emmanuel's father returned to him to make amends. Emmanuel clarifies in the documentary that he doesn't buy the excuses his father stresses, but gifts his father with his forgiveness anyway. The documentary wraps up by showing many promising changes Emmanuel has made to Ghana and plans to make in the future.

References

External links
 

2005 films
Documentary films about people with disability
Films set in Ghana
American documentary films
2005 documentary films
Disability in Ghana
2000s American films